Poison City Records is an independent record label based in Melbourne, Victoria, founded in 2003. The label opened a physical store in 2008, at 400 Brunswick Street, Fitzroy selling records and skateboards. In mid-2020, the store and label moved from Fitzroy to Preston.

From 2008 to 2017, Poison City ran an annual three-day punk rock music festival called Poison City Weekender, with bands playing at multiple venues throughout Melbourne.

Artists released by Poison City Records

Current roster
 An Horse
 Batpiss
 Bench Press
 Body Type
 Cable Ties
 Camp Cope
 Dark Fair
 Flyying Colours
 Harmony
 Hexdebt
 Hoodlum Shouts
 Kelso
 Loobs
 Lou Barlow (Australian releases only)
 Lincoln Le Fevre
 Michael Beach
 The Meanies
 Mere Women
 Mod Con
 Moody Beaches
 The Nation Blue
 Palm Springs
 Swervedriver (Australian releases only)
 TV Haze

Alumni
 A Death in the Family
 Apart From This
 The Bennies
 Chinese Burns Unit
 Clowns
 Conation
 Daylight Robbery
 Daysworth Fighting
 Deep Heat
 Fear Like Us
 Fires of Waco
 Flour
 Former Cell Mates
 Freak Wave
 Gareth Liddiard
 The Gifthorse
 Grand Fatal
 Grim Fandango
 Horror My Friend

 Human Parts
 Infinite Void
 Jen Buxton
 Kill Whitey
 Knapsack
 Lead Sketch Union
 Like...Alaska
 Luca Brasi
 Lungs
 The Optionals
 Paper Arms
 Postblue
 Restorations
 Ribbons Patterns
 Samiam
 Screamfeeder
 The Smith Street Band
 Tyre Swans
 White Walls
 Wil Wagner

References

External links 

 
 

Record labels established in 2003
Australian independent record labels
Punk record labels
Ska record labels
Hardcore record labels